John F. Kennedy International Airport has been the site of many aviation accidents and incidents.

1952
5 April A Curtiss C-46 Commando operating for US Airlines, leased from the USAF, a cargo flight with 2 occupants inbound from Raleigh-Durham International Airport, crashed 4.4 miles north of Idlewild tower in heavy rain and overcast conditions at the intersection of 169 Street and 89th Avenue in Jamaica, Queens, New York. Both occupants were killed and 3 on the ground also died. Cause of the accident was a loss of control following a sudden engine failure caused by a deteriorated fuel feed valve during an attempted missed approach.

1953
19 October An Eastern Air Lines flight from Idlewild International Airport (the former name of JFK) to San Juan, Puerto Rico, a Lockheed L-749A Constellation, N119A, crashed on take-off. Two passengers were killed.

1954
18 DecemberA Linee Aeree Italiane Douglas DC-6 crashed on its fourth approach attempt to land at Idlewild, after circling for 2.5 hours. 26 of the 32 passengers on board were killed.

1958
10 NovemberVickers Viscount, CF-TGL of Trans-Canada Air Lines was destroyed by fire after it was struck by Lockheed L-749 Constellation N6503C of Seaboard & Western Airlines which had crashed on take-off.

1960

16 DecemberA United Airlines Douglas DC-8 and a TWA Lockheed Super Constellation collided; the DC-8 crashed in Park Slope, Brooklyn, the Super Constellation on Staten Island, killing all 128 people on board both airliners and six on the ground.

1961
19 January Aeronaves de Mexico Flight 401, a Douglas DC-8-21 with 97 passengers and 9 crew on board bound for Mexico City, crashed and burned after aborting takeoff from Runway 07R in marginally bad weather, there was snow on the runway, 4 crewmembers were killed.

1962
1 MarchAmerican Airlines Flight 1,  a Boeing 707 crashed on takeoff from Idlewild after its rudder jammed. All 87 passengers and 8 crew members were killed.

30 NovemberEastern Air Lines Flight 512, a Douglas DC-7, crashed into the ground during a missed approach, killing 25 of the 51 on board.

1963
4 OctoberNew York Airways Flight 600, a Boeing Vertol 107 helicopter, crashed shortly after takeoff from Idlewild Airport (now JFK) en route to Newark via Wall Street. All three passengers and all three crew members died. The accident was blamed on a mechanical failure due to contaminated lubricants.

1965
8 FebruaryEastern Air Lines Flight 663, a Douglas DC-7, crashed off Jones Beach after takeoff when the pilots found themselves on an apparent collision course with an inbound Pan Am Boeing 707 and made evasive maneuvers. All 84 passengers and crew perished.

1969
15 July A New York Airways de Havilland Canada DHC-6 Twin Otter with 11 passengers and 3 crew bound for Newark International Airport lost control and crashed after taking off from a runway intersection, encountering wake turbulence from a recently departed jet, 2 crewmembers and 1 passenger were killed.

1970
8 SeptemberTrans International Airlines Flight 863, a DC-8-63CF ferry flight to Dulles International Airport crashed on takeoff from runway 13R, killing all 11 crewmembers on board. The DC-8 freighter started rotating in a nose-high attitude  into the take-off. After becoming airborne at  down the runway, the aircraft climbed to about 300–500 feet, rolled 20 degrees to the left, crashed and caught fire. The loss of pitch control was caused by the entrapment of a pointed, asphalt-covered object between the leading edge of the right elevator and the right horizontal spar web access door in the aft part of the stabilizer.

1973 
23 JuneLoftleiðir Icelandic Douglas DC-8 (registered N8960T) was damaged in a tail-first landing at John F. Kennedy International Airport, when it completed Flight 509 on the Stockholm-Oslo-Reykjavík-New York route with 119 passengers and nine crew members on board. An NTSB investigation found that the accident was caused by a flawed procedure when the spoilers were extended (right after touchdown rather than once the landing gear had been lowered).

1975
24 JuneEastern Air Lines Flight 66, a Boeing 727 on final approach from New Orleans, crashed into the runway lights short of runway 22L, killing 113 passengers and crew. The cause of the crash was wind shear during a heavy thunderstorm.

12 NovemberOverseas National Airways Flight 032, a McDonnell Douglas DC-10-30, struck a flock of sea gulls during takeoff, crashing past Taxiway Z. All 129 passengers and 10 crew members escaped successfully while the aircraft was destroyed. The cause of the accident was determined to have been seagulls, which struck the landing gear and the right engine, resulting in an uncontained engine failure.

1984
28 FebruaryScandinavian Airlines System Flight 901, a McDonnell Douglas DC-10-30 with 163 passengers and 14 crew on board arriving from Oslo, Norway overran runway 4R on landing in low visibility and wound up in shallow water 200 meters from the end of the runway, injuring 12 passengers. The cause of the accident was the crew's failure to monitor their airspeed and overreliance on the aircraft's autothrottle. Although substantially damaged, the plane was later repaired and returned to service.

1990
25 JanuaryAvianca Flight 52, a Boeing 707-321B arriving from Bogotá and Medellin, crashed at Cove Neck, Long Island, after a missed approach to runway 22L at JFK and subsequently running out of fuel. 73 passengers and crew perished while 85 survived.

1992
30 JulyTWA Flight 843, a Lockheed L-1011 TriStar departing for San Francisco, aborted takeoff shortly after liftoff. There were no fatalities among the 280 passengers and 12 crew, although the aircraft was destroyed.

1993
11 FebruaryLufthansa Flight 592, an Airbus A310 from Frankfurt, was hijacked by an Ethiopian man seeking asylum in the United States, landed at JFK. The hijacker surrendered.

1996
17 JulyTWA Flight 800,  was a Boeing 747-100 that exploded and crashed into the Atlantic Ocean near East Moriches, New York, at about 8:31 p.m. EDT, 12 minutes after takeoff from John F. Kennedy International Airport on a scheduled international passenger flight to Rome, with a stopover in Paris.  All 230 people on board died in the third-deadliest aviation accident in U.S. history.

2001
12 NovemberAmerican Airlines Flight 587, an Airbus A300, crashed a few kilometers away from JFK, while en route to Santo Domingo in the Dominican Republic. During climb, the first officer's overuse of rudder controls in response to wake turbulence from a Japan Airlines Boeing 747-400 that took off minutes before it, caused the vertical fin to snap. The plane crashed into the Belle Harbor neighborhood of Queens. The crash killed all 260 people on the plane and five people on the ground. 
It was thought that this was a terrorist attack on account of the fact that this incident occurred two months and a day after the September 11 attacks, however that was confirmed to not be the case.

2011
11 AprilAir France Flight 007, operated with an Airbus A380, collided with Delta Connection Flight 6293, a Bombardier CRJ 701, while the Airbus was taxiing for takeoff from JFK. None of the passengers or crew members on either airplane were injured.

2014

In December 2014, Cho hyu-ah, the daughter of the then Korean Air chairman, Cho An, ordered the pilot of a Korean Air to drive back to the gate. The reason for this is the flight attendant had served nuts to her in packaging as opposed to on a plate. Cho was later arrested by authorities and later resigned. Later it was found out that Cho acted the same way on another flight in 2013.

2018
11 SeptemberAir India Flight 101, a Boeing 777-300ER, developed a multiple system failure while landing at JFK. The aircraft's ILS (Instrument Landing System) and TCAS system had failed at final approach into JFK. The crippled aircraft was diverted to Newark Liberty International Airport and the aircraft safely landed there.

2020
6 DecemberAeroflot Flight 102, a passenger flight with the plane tail number of VQ-BIL coming from Moscow to New York, received a bomb threat that caused the temporary closure of a runway and the delay of Aeroflot Flight 103, a return flight back to Moscow. The bomb threat in question was published from a Twitter account that was compromised by hackers with the aliases of "Omnipotent" and "choonkeat".

2023
13 JanuaryA near-collision occurred when American Airlines Flight 106 crossed Runway 4L while Delta Air Lines Flight 1943 was taking off there. After being warned by the air traffic controllers, Flight 1943 successfully aborted its takeoff and stopped  before crashing into Flight 106.

References

John F. Kennedy International Airport
John F. Kennedy International Airport